Trichlorotrifluoroethane may refer to:

 1,1,1-Trichloro-2,2,2-trifluoroethane
 1,1,2-Trichloro-1,2,2-trifluoroethane